Imperial Fields is a football stadium in Mitcham, south London, which is home to Tooting & Mitcham United and Kingstonian. It is also the former ground of  Chelsea Ladies. The stadium opened in 2002, and has a total capacity of 3,500 (612 seated).

Men's football
Tooting & Mitcham United moved in 2002 from an all-wooden facility at Sandy Lane in Mitcham.

In the 2017–18 season, Dulwich Hamlet groundshared at the ground after disagreements with the owner of its Champion Hill ground.

The record attendance for Imperial Fields was set by Dulwich Hamlet in their Isthmian Premier Division play-off final win against Hendon with an attendance of 3,321 on 7 May 2018. Tooting & Mitcham's record attendance at the stadium was set by a 1–1 draw with AFC Wimbledon on 16 April 2005, which saw a crowd of 2,637.

Before the 2022–23 season, Kingstonian moved to Imperial Fields.

Women's football 
The stadium hosted the first ever game of the FA WSL on 13 April 2011. Arsenal Ladies beat Chelsea Ladies 1–0 with a goal from Gilly Flaherty.

References

External links
Chelsea Ladies page
Fulham Page
Tooting and Mitcham page
Pyramid Passion page
 

Buildings and structures in the London Borough of Merton
Chelsea F.C. Women
Sports venues in London
Football venues in England
Tourist attractions in the London Borough of Merton
Sports venues completed in 2002
2002 establishments in England
Women's Super League venues